Thomas Ridout (March 17, 1754 – February 8, 1829) was a political figure in Upper Canada.

Life and career
He was born in Sherborne, England, in 1754 and moved to Annapolis, Maryland in 1774. In 1787, he was travelling to Kentucky when his group was captured by a party of Shawnees; he was held captive and later released in Detroit, then held by the British. Ridout fled to Montreal instead of returning to Annapolis. He married the daughter of a Loyalist and settled with his family at Newark (Niagara-on-the-Lake).

Ridout started work in 1793 as clerk for the Surveyor-General of Upper Canada, moved to York in 1797 and then as interim Surveyor-General with William Chewett from 1804 to 1805. In 1810, he was appointed to the post of Surveyor-General for Upper Canada in 1807, replacing Charles Burton Wyatt and Joseph Bouchette. It was in that position that he came to know Elijah Bentley. He had also been named registrar for York County in 1796 and justice of the peace in the Home District in 1806 and Chairman of the Home District Council from 1811 to 1829. In 1812, he was elected to the Legislative Assembly of Upper Canada representing East York and Simcoe. He served on the board set up to deal with claims for compensation for losses sustained during the War of 1812. In 1825, he was named to the Legislative Council. In 1827, he was appointed to the first board of King's College.

He died in York (Toronto) in 1829. His sons, Samuel Smith Ridout (store keeper, militia soldier, Clerk of Surveyor General and Sheriff of York County), George Ridout (lawyer and judge), John Ridout and Thomas Gibbs Ridout, were also prominent members of Upper Canada society.
His granddaughter, Matilda Ridout Edgar, was a historian and feminist. In 1890 she published Ten years of Upper Canada in peace and war, 1805–1815, an edited collection of letters between Ridout and his sons George and Thomas Gibbs. This is a valuable source of information about life in Toronto and about the battles of the War of 1812.

References

Sources

Bibliography
 Jack Dwyer: Dorset Pioneers: The History Press: 2009:

External links 

 Thomas Ridout family fonds, Archives of Ontario

1754 births
1829 deaths
English emigrants to pre-Confederation Ontario
Members of the Legislative Assembly of Upper Canada
Members of the Legislative Council of Upper Canada
People from Sherborne
Canadian justices of the peace
Immigrants to Upper Canada